Pooles Branch (also spelled Pools Branch) is a stream in Monroe County in the U.S. state of Missouri. It is a tributary of Elk Fork Salt River.

Pooles Branch has the name of Felix Pool, original owner of the site.

See also
List of rivers of Missouri

References

Rivers of Monroe County, Missouri
Rivers of Missouri